The Royal Gustavus Adolphus Academy in Uppsala is one of 18 Swedish royal academies and dedicated to the study of Swedish folklore.

The Academy was founded on 6 November 1932, on the occasion of the 300th anniversary of the death of King Gustavus Adolphus in the Battle of Lützen. It was initiated by the Professor of Nordic Languages, Jöran Sahlgren, and the first president was the historian and politician Karl Gustaf Westman. The academy has 40 full members, excepting those who have reached the age of 70, and 30 foreign members.

External links
Official website

 
Organizations established in 1932
Gustavus Adolphus Academy
Gustavus Adolphus Academy
1932 establishments in Sweden
Gustavus Adolphus of Sweden